The following list is the production discography of ID Labs, as well as its individual members

Production credits

2006

Wiz Khalifa – Show and Prove
"Intro"
"I Choose You"
"Damn Thing" (produced with Johnny Juliano)
"I'm Gonna Ride"
"Let 'Em Know"
"Sometimes" (featuring Vali Porter) [produced with Champ Super]
"History in the Making / Never Too Late"

Wiz Khalifa – Prince of the City 2
"Intro"
"Gettin It"
"Gotta Get It"
"Chevy (Remix)"
"I Still Remember"

2008

Wiz Khalifa – Say Yeah
 "Say Yeah" (produced with Johnny Juliano)

2009

Wiz Khalifa – Deal or No Deal
 "Bout Y'all (featuring Josh Everette)"
 "Chewy"
 "Hit tha Flo"
Lose Control
Take Away
This Plane

Wiz Khalifa – Flight School
Teach You To Fly
Superstar
Superstar
Extra Extra Credit

2010
Wiz Khalifa – Kush & Orange Juice
 Waken Baken (Big Jerm)
 The Statement (Remix) (E. Dan)
 The Kid Frankie (Big Jerm)
 Good Dank (E. Dan)

Mac Miller – K.I.D.S.
Outside (Sayez)
 "Paper Route" (featuring Chevy Woods) (Sayez)
 "Knock Knock" (E. Dan)

2011

Snoop Dogg and Wiz Khalifa – Mac & Devin Go to High School
 "OG (featuring Curren$y)"
 "Dev's Song"

Mac Miller – Blue Slide Park
 "Blue Slide Park"
 "Party on Fifth Ave."
 "Frick Park Market"
 "Smile Back"
 "Under the Weather"
 "Of the Soul"
 "Up All Night" (produced with Mac Miller)
 "Loitering" (produced with Young L)
 "Diamonds and Gold"
 "Man in the Hat" (produced with Ritz Reynolds)

Wiz Khalifa – Rolling Papers
 "When I'm Gone" 
 "Wake Up" (Big Jerm)
 "The Race"
 "Star of the Show (featuring Chevy Woods)" (E. Dan)
 "No Sleep" (Big Jerm with Benny Blanco)
 "Get Your Shit" (E. Dan)
 "Top Floor" (Big Jerm)
 "Fly Solo" (E. Dan)
 "Rooftops" (feat Curren$y) (Big Jerm
 "Cameras" (E. Dan)

Mac Miller – Best Day Ever
 "Best Day Ever (Intro)"
 "Oy Vey"
 "Wake Up" (produced with SAP)
 "Life Ain’t Easy"
 "Snooze"
 "Keep Floatin’" (featuring Wiz Khalifa)
 "BDE Bonus"

Mac Miller – On and On and Beyond
 "On and On" (produced with Andrew Dawson)
 "Life Ain't Easy"
 "Live Free"

Mac Miller – I Love Life, Thank You
 "Willie Dynamite" (Big Jerm)
 "The Miller Family Reunion" (Big Jerm)
 "Boom Bap Rap (featuring The Come Up)" (Big Jerm, produced with Mac Miller)
 "Just a Kid" (E. Dan)
 "All That (featuring Bun B)" (E. Dan)
 "All This" (E. Dan)

Juicy J – Blue Dream and Lean
 "Real Hustlers Don't Sleep (featuring SpaceGhostPurrp & A$AP Rocky)"

2012

Wiz Khalifa – O.N.I.F.C.
 "Paperbond"
 "Let it Go (featuring Akon)" (co-produced with Jo A)
 "The Bluff (featuring Cam'ron)"
 "Got Everything (featuring Courtney Noelle)" (produced with Sledgren and Rykeyz)
 "Time"
 "No Limit" (produced with Nice Rec)
 "The Plan (featuring Juicy J)"

Wiz Khalifa – Taylor Allerdice
 "Amber Ice"
 "The Cruise" (Big Jerm)
 "Rowland (featuring Smoke DZA" (Big Jerm)

Wiz Khalifa – Cabin Fever 2
 "MIA (featuring Juicy J)"
 "Deep Sleep"
 "100 Bottles (featuring Problem)"
 "Thuggin" (featuring Chevy Woods & Lavish)" (produced with Sledgren)
 "Nothin Like the Rest (featuring French Montana)"

Chevy Woods – Gang Land
 "Jacksonville"
 "Circumstances"
 "Two Hundred"

Mac Miller – Macadelic
 "Desperado"
 "Loud" (Big Jerm, Sayez)
 "Vitamins"
 "The Question (feat. Lil Wayne)" (produced with Wally West)
 "Clarity" (produced with Ritz Reynolds)
 "Fuck 'Em All"

Xzibit – Napalm
 "Forever A G" – (feat. Wiz Khalifa)

G. Twilight – FirstTime Felon
 "When The Morning Comes"

2013

Freddie Gibbs – ESGN
 "D.O.A. (featuring G-Wiz & Big Kill)" (produced with J Reese)
 "Ten Packs of Backwoods (featuring D-Edge)"
 "Freddie Soprano"

Mac Miller – Watching Movies with the Sound Off
 "Avian"
 "Matches (featuring Ab-Soul)"
 "Someone Like You" (produced with J. Hill)
 "Claymation (featuring Vinny Radio)"

Juicy J – Stay Trippy
 "Talkin' Bout (featuring Chris Brown and Wiz Khalifa)" (produced with SAP and Ritz Reynolds)

Ludacris – #IDGAF
 "She's a Trip (featuring Mac Miller)"

Rockie Fresh – Electric Highway
 "Hold Me Down"

Snow tha Product – Good Nights & Bad Mornings 2: The Hangover
 "Lord Be With You" (produced with Mike Nef)
 "Fuck Your Phone"
 "I'm Doing Fine"
 "Bad Mornings"

Mac Miller – Live from Space
 "Eggs Aisle"
 "Earth (featuring Future)" (produced with Teddy Roxpin)

G. Twilight – Another Detroit Gangster Story
 "So Real"

2014

Wiz Khalifa – Blacc Hollywood
 "Hope (featuring Ty Dolla $ign)" (produced with N. Cameron)
 "House in the Hills (featuring Curren$y)" (produced with Sledgren)
 "Still Down (featuring Chevy Woods and Ty Dolla $ign)"
 "No Gain"

Wiz Khalifa – 28 Grams
 "James Bong"
 "What Iss Hittin"
 "My Nigs (featuring Curren$y)"
 "The Rain"

Mac Miller – Faces
 "It Just Doesn't Matter"
 "Therapy"
 "Funeral"
 "Insomniak (featuring Rick Ross)"

2015

Mac Miller – GO:OD AM
 "Brand Name" (produced with Thundercat)
 "Rush Hour"
 "100 Grandkids" (produced with Sha Money XL)
 "When in Rome"
 "Ascension"
 "Jump" (produced with Badboxes and DJ Dahi)
 "The Festival (featuring Little Dragon)" (produced with Little Dragon)

Fall Out Boy – Make America Psycho Again
 "Uma Thurman (featuring Wiz Khalifa)" (remix produced with Jake Sinclair, Young Wolf Hatchlings and Badboxes)

Choo Jackson – Broken Hearts Make Money
 "HD" (feat. Mac Miller)

Chevy Woods – The Cookout
 "Cookout"
 "Aunts n Uncles"
 "Invitation"

2016

Wiz Khalifa – Khalifa
 "Elevated"
 "Make a Play (featuring J.R. Donato)" (produced with Shod Beatz)
 "Most of Us"
 "Lit (featuring Ty Dolla $ign)" (produced with Jay Card, and Dru Tang)
 "No Permission (featuring Chevy Woods)" (produced with Shod Beatz)
 "iSay (featuring Juicy J)"

Wiz Khalifa – The Hamilton Mixtape
 "Washington's by Your Side"

Mac Miller – The Divine Feminine
"Stay"
"Soulmate" (additional production by E. Dan)

2017

Rob $tone – Don't Wait For it
 "Lemon Grove"

Your Old Droog – Packs
 "G.K.A.C."

Choo Jackson – Parade
 "Wake Me Up"
 "Right Away"
 "Make You Feel"
 "Holy Water"
 "Dinnertime"
 "Redbull - interlude"
 "Talk"
 "Neighbors"

2018

Mac Miller – Swimming
 "Self Care" (produced with DJ Dahi and Nostxlgic)

Wiz Khalifa – Rolling Papers 2
 "Fr Fr"
 "Rolling Papers 2"
 "Late Night Messages"
 "King"
 "Be Ok"
 "Reach For The Stars"

GNAR – Gnar Lif3
 "GRAVE"

Warm Brew – New Content
 "Player Way" 
 "Psychedelic"
 "Ricki Lake"
 "When I Can"

Chevy Woods – "81"
 "Off the Porch"

2019
Dreamville – Revenge of the Dreamers III
 "Wells Fargo" (with JID and Earthgang feat. Buddy and Guapdad 4000)

Yung Bans – Misunderstood
 "Gang" (produced with TM88)

Wiz Khalifa – Never Lie
 "Never Lie" (feat. Moneybagg Yo)

Wiz Khalifa – Alright
 "Alright" (feat Trippie Redd and Preme)

Lil Xan – Watch Me Fall
 "Watch Me Fall"

Wiz Khalifa – Fly Times Vol. 1: The Good Fly Young
 "G.O.A.T. Flow" (feat. THEMXXNLIGHT)

2020
Mac Miller – Circles
 "Woods" (produced with David x Eli and Jon Brion)

Hardo – Days Inn
 "Hurry up & buy" (produced with Christo)

Wiz Khalifa – The Saga of Wiz Khalifa
 "High Today" (feat. Logic)

Smoke DZA – Worldwide Smoke Session
 "Premium"

Problem – Coffee & Kush, Vol. 1
 "Janet Freestyle (Remix)"

2021
I.D. Labs – Play How You Feel
 "Simplest Thing"
 "The Brace"
 "Siti"
 "Silence"
 "Sinnerlude
 "Woozy"
 "Higher" (co-production feat. J Card)
 "Idekbro"
 "Telemed"
 "Werewolf" (co-production feat. Nice Rec)
 "Fair One" (co-production feat. Nice Rec)
 "Thursday's Dream"

My Favorite Color – Old News
 "Old News"

2022
Bocha – Neck of the Woods
 "Stories" (feat. Donte Thomas & Shelby Swims)

Wiz Khalifa – Multiverse
 "MVP"

Production discographies